Boston Latino TV (BLTv) is an English-language, culturally Latino production that utilizes new media to showcase the Latino presence in Boston on Public-access television cable TV. BLTv positively portrays the Latino culture through both, Latino hosts and on-site event video coverage, among English-Speaking Americans.

Production team
Digna Gerena - Executive Producer
Araminta Romero - Director of Development
Evelyn Reyes - Producer and Host
Gil Matos - Producer and Host
Clairemese Montero - Host
Omar Cabrera - Host
Tim Estiloz - Film Critic / Host
LuzMar Centeno - Professional Photographer
Marlene Sanchez - Production Assistant

References
Boston Latino TV Official Site
Boston Latino TV Access Awards Honors Contributions of Latinos in Boston, By El Mundo Newspaper
Boston Sports from a Latino Perspective, By The Boston Globe
Boston Latino TV on Ethnic Newz
El Bohemio recommends Boston Latino TV

American public access television shows
Culture of Boston
Hispanic and Latino American culture in Boston
Local talk shows in the United States